Buffalo Lakes is a lake chain in South Dakota, in the United States.

Buffalo Lakes takes its name from Buffalo Township.

See also
List of lakes in South Dakota

References

Lakes of South Dakota
Lakes of Marshall County, South Dakota